The Münster–Hamm railway is an almost 36 kilometre-long, continuous double-track and electrified main line railway from Münster to Hamm in the German state of North Rhine-Westphalia. It was one of Germany's oldest railways, built by the Munster Hamm Railway Company, which was established for this purpose, and opened on 26 May 1848.

History 
The Cologne-Minden Railway Company (CME) built its trunk line directly across Westphalia, bypassing the region around the town of Münster. The Munster Hamm Railway Company (Münster-Hammer Eisenbahn-Gesellschaft, MHE) was established to build a branch line to connect with the CME line. This line was opened on 26 May 1848 for passengers and on 8 July 1848 for freight traffic.

The company and line were taken over in 1855 by the Prussian government-funded Royal Westphalian Railway Company (KWE). The line was extended in the following year to Rheine as the Münster–Rheine line.

Operations 
Although, formerly individual InterCity services ran on the line, it is now mainly used by regional (Regional-Express and regionalbahn) services running through western Westphalia and southern Münsterland. It is served by:
the hourly Rhein-Münsterland-Express (RE7) with stops in Hamm, Drensteinfurt, Münster-Hiltrup and Münster Hauptbahnhof.
every half-hour during the day Monday to Friday, otherwise hourly, the Ems-Börde-Bahn (RB69/89) with stops at all stations.

Notes

External links 
NRW rail archive of André Joost:
 [strecken/2931.htm Description of line 2931]: Münster ↔ Hamm
 [strecken/2011.htm Description of line 2011]: Lechtenberg junction ↔ Kanal
 [strecken/2920.htm Description of line 2920]: Feldmark junction ↔ Hamm Rbf Hvn

Railway lines in North Rhine-Westphalia
Münster (region)
Buildings and structures in Hamm
Railway lines opened in 1848
1848 establishments in Prussia

nl:Spoorlijn Münster - Hamm